Caroline Pearce (born 1 September 1981 in Cambridge, England) is an English athlete, sports host, model, published author,  and is the presenter for BT Sport's UFC: Beyond The Octagon and reporter for Fox Sports and UFC Fight Pass. She played the character Ice in Sky One's version of Gladiators.

Biography
Pearce competed for England in the World Pentathlon Championships at the age of 15. She had competed as a professional heptathlete in the 2004 European Cup Heptathlon Finals. Pearce has also represented Great Britain as a bobsledder in the 2005 World Bobsleigh Championships.

In 2008, Pearce was chosen to compete as a gladiator in Sky One's relaunch of the TV series Gladiators under the gladiator name "Ice", but she left the show after the first season.

Pearce has earned a first class honours degree in Sports Science and a master's degree in Physiology and Nutrition from Loughborough University. She has modelled in advertisements for Nike, Reebok, Adidas, Ron Hill and Fitness-Mad and shot with world renowned photographer Rankin. She is a published author of 'Better Body Workouts for Women' with publishers Human Kinetics and a master trainer and spokesperson for Power Plate training equipment.

Pearce has also appeared on The Friday Night Project as the "Coat of Cash wearing Celebrity".

References

1981 births
Living people
English heptathletes
British heptathletes
British female athletes
British female modern pentathletes
English female bobsledders
British female bobsledders
Gladiators (1992 British TV series)
Alumni of Loughborough University
People from Cambridge
BT Sport presenters and reporters